Reuben Tucker (born 30 December 1956) is a wrestler from Guam. He competed in the men's freestyle 90 kg at the 1988 Summer Olympics.

References

External links
 

1956 births
Living people
Guamanian male sport wrestlers
Olympic wrestlers of Guam
Wrestlers at the 1988 Summer Olympics
Place of birth missing (living people)